Limapontiidae is a taxonomic family of small to minute sacoglossan sea slugs. These are marine opisthobranch gastropod mollusks.

These sea slugs resemble nudibranchs, but are not closely related to them. Most of the species are green because of the green algae they eat and live on.

In the taxonomy of Bouchet & Rocroi (2005), the former family Stiligeridae is described as a synonym of the family Limapontiidae Gray, 1847, belonging to the superfamily Limapontioidea Jensen, 1996.

This family has no subfamilies.

Genera
The following  genera belong to the family Limapontiidae:
 Alderella Odhner in Franc, 1968
 Alderia Allman, 1846
 Alderiopsis Baba, 1968
 Calliopaea d'Orbigny, 1837
  Costasiella Pruvot-Fol, 1951 - 15 species
 Ercolania Trinchese, 1872
 Limapontia Johnston, 1836 - type genus
 Olea Agersborg, 1923
 Placida Trinchese, 1876
 Sacoproteus Krug et al. 2018
 Stiliger Ehrenberg, 1831
Genera brought into synonymy 
 Alderina Pruvot-Fol, 1954 : synonym of Alderella Odhner in Franc, 1968
 Chalidis Quatrefages, 1844 : synonym of  Limapontia Johnston, 1836
 Custiphorus Deshayes, 1853 : synonym of  Calliopaea d'Orbigny, 1837
 Laura Trinchese, 1873 : synonym of  Placida Trinchese, 1876

References

 Jensen K.R. (2007) Biogeography of the Sacoglossa (Mollusca, Opisthobranchia). Bonner Zoologische Beiträge 55:255–281.

 
Taxa named by John Edward Gray